cpplint or cpplint.py is an open source lint-like tool developed by Google,
designed to ensure that C++ code conforms to Google's coding style guides.

Therefore cpplint implements what Google considers best practices in C++ coding. The script cpplint.py reads source code files and flags deviations from the style guide. It also identifies syntax errors. It is rules based, and uses a number of heuristics to identify bad code.

cpplint.py suffers from both false positives and false negatives.
 to suppress only the incriminated rule category).

Line length rule can be configured with option 
Some options can be stored in a configuration file .

cpplint is implemented as a Python script.
It is distributed under the 3 clause BSD license.

See also
 google/styleguide/cpplint - GitHub
 Advanced fork of cpplint on PyPI

References

Static program analysis tools
Google software
Software using the BSD license